Freeman Spogli & Co. is a private equity firm dedicated to investing with management in middle market companies in the consumer and distribution sectors through leveraged buyouts and recapitalizations. The firm invests in the United States.

History
Freeman Spogli, originally known as Riordan, Freeman & Spogli, was founded in 1983 by Richard Riordan, Bradford M. Freeman, and Ronald P. Spogli.

Co-founder Richard Riordan, who would later go on to serve as Mayor of Los Angeles, had been an attorney and had made substantial personal investments in technology companies.  After joining the firm, Riordan focused primarily on venture capital investments in computer, medical, and semiconductor companies.  Prior to co-founding Freeman Spogli, Bradford Freeman and Ronald P. Spogli had been Managing Directors in the Corporate Finance Department at Dean Witter Reynolds.

The firm made its name in the 1980s through a series of leveraged buyout transactions.  Throughout the 1980s, Riordan, Freeman & Spogli also executed leveraged buyouts of several supermarket retailers including Bayless Southwest (Phoenix), Boys Markets (Los Angeles), P&C Foods (Syracuse, NY), Piggly Wiggly (various Southern states), and Tops Markets (New York and Pennsylvania).

Riordan separated from the other two partners in 1988 when they decided to specialize in larger leveraged buyouts of more established companies. Riordan relinquished his general partner position in the firm to form a venture capital firm called Riordan, Lewis & Haden with J. Christopher Lewis and former Los Angeles Rams quarterback Pat Haden. Following Riordan's departure, the firm was renamed Freeman Spogli & Co.

Investments
Among the firm's historical investments are the following:

A.J. Bayless Markets
Advance Auto Parts
Batteries Plus Bulbs
Boot Barn
CB Richard Ellis
El Pollo Loco
First Watch
HHGregg
Micro Warehouse
NEW Asurion
The Paradies Shops
P&C Foods
PETCO
Piggly Wiggly
Savers
Smile Brands 
Sur La Table
Tops Markets
Winebow

See also
Riordan, Lewis & Haden 
Freeman Spogli Institute for International Studies

References

Notes

 Taub, Daniel. "Riordan made his fortune backing start-up ventures," Los Angeles Business Journal, June 30, 1997
 Zwiebach, Elloitt "The LBO maker (leveraged buyouts, Riordan Freeman & Spogli merchant bank)", Supermarket News, July 1987

External links
Freeman Spogli & Co. (company website)

Financial services companies established in 1983
Private equity firms of the United States